Westbrook is a city in Cottonwood County, Minnesota, United States. The population was 739 at the 2010 census.

History
Westbrook was founded September 17, 1870.  It was platted June 8, 1900.  The city was named from its location near the west branch of Highwater Creek.

Geography

Minnesota State Highway 30 serves as a main route in the community.

Demographics

2010 census
As of the census of 2010, there were 739 people, 345 households, and 192 families residing in the city. The racial makeup of the city was 97.7% White, 0.4% Native American, 0.9% Asian, 0.7% from other races, and 0.3% from two or more races. Hispanic or Latino of any race were 2.2% of the population.

There were 345 households, of which 18.6% had children under the age of 18 living with them, 46.7% were married couples living together, 5.2% had a female householder with no husband present, 3.8% had a male householder with no wife present, and 44.3% were non-families. 40.9% of all households were made up of individuals, and 23.4% had someone living alone who was 65 years of age or older. The average household size was 2.04 and the average family size was 2.71.

The median age in the city was 54 years. 18.7% of residents were under the age of 18; 4.8% were between the ages of 18 and 24; 17.6% were from 25 to 44; 25% were from 45 to 64; and 33.8% were 65 years of age or older. The gender makeup of the city was 44.2% male and 55.8% female.

2000 census
As of the census of 2000, there were 755 people, 367 households, and 209 families residing in the city. The racial makeup of the city was 98.01% White, 0.13% African American, 0.40% Native American, 0.40% Asian, 0.13% from other races, and 0.93% from two or more races. Hispanic or Latino of any race were 0.66% of the population.

There were 367 households, out of which 18.5% had children under the age of 18 living with them, 48.5% were married couples living together, 7.1% had a female householder with no husband present, and 42.8% were non-families. 39.8% of all households were made up of individuals, and 28.3% had someone living alone who was 65 years of age or older.  The average household size was 2.06 and the average family size was 2.74.

In the city, the population was spread out, with 20.5% under the age of 18, 4.4% from 18 to 24, 17.7% from 25 to 44, 21.9% from 45 to 64, and 35.5% who were 65 years of age or older.  The median age was 52 years. For every 100 females, there were 79.3 males.  For every 100 females age 18 and over, there were 74.4 males.

The median income for a household in the city was $24,063, and the median income for a family was $33,472. Males had a median income of $27,188 versus $18,056 for females. The per capita income for the city was $15,919.  13.5% of the population and 8.5% of families were below the poverty line.  Out of the total people living in poverty, 28.6% of those under the age of 18 and 9.1% of those 65 and older were living below the poverty line.

Sister City
Walnut Grove, Minnesota and Westbrook are sister cities because Westbrook-Walnut Grove (WWG) Public Schools is distributed between both towns.

Westbrook-Walnut Grove Public Schools

Starting with the 1991–1992 school year, the Westbrook Wildcats and the Walnut Grove Loggers combined school districts and sports teams to make the Westbrook-Walnut Grove Chargers.

WWG Information
 Schools – one High School in Westbrook (Grades 7–12) and one Elementary School in Walnut Grove (Grades K-6)
 Mascot – Chargers
 School Colors – Red and Silver
 ISD – 2898

Politics
Westbrook is located in Minnesota's 7th congressional district, represented by Collin Peterson, a Democrat.  At the state level, Westbrook is located in Senate District 22, represented by Republican Doug Magnus, and in House District 22B, represented by Republican Rod Hamilton.

References

External links
 Historic photographs
 Westbrook Community Guide

Cities in Cottonwood County, Minnesota
Cities in Minnesota